Saskia Elisabeth Agatha Noorman-den Uyl (born 31 March 1946) is a retired Dutch politician of the Labour Party (PvdA).

Noorman-den Uyl served as a Member of the House of Representatives from 17 May 1994 until 30 November 2006. She is the oldest daughter of former Prime Minister of the Netherlands Joop den Uyl.

References

External links
Official

  Ing. S.E.A. (Saskia) Noorman-den Uyl Parlement & Politiek

1946 births
Living people
Aldermen in North Holland
Dutch agnostics
Dutch civil servants
Dutch women architects
Dutch women in politics
Labour Party (Netherlands) politicians
Members of the House of Representatives (Netherlands)
Municipal councillors of Amsterdam
Gerrit Rietveld Academie alumni
Vrije Universiteit Amsterdam alumni
Knights of the Order of Orange-Nassau
People from Heemstede